Habba Khatoon (born Zoon; 1554–1609; sometimes spelled Khatun), also known by the honorary title The Nightingale of Kashmir, was a Kashmiri Muslim poet and ascetic in the 16th century. Her compositions have been sung and recited countless times since their inception in the valley, and she's considered as one of the greatest Kashmiri poets of all time, with unmatched verbal prowess.

Biography
She was born in a small village in Chandhara. Pampore, Pulwama in Kashmir. Her real name was Zoon or Zun.
 
</ref> According to the oral tradition, she was called Zoon because of her great beauty. Although a peasant, she learnt how to read and write from the village moulvi. 

According to legend, one day Yousuf Shah Chak, the last independent emperor of Kashmir, was out hunting on horseback. He heard Zoon singing under the shade of a chinar tree, and the couple met and fell in love. The oral tradition describes Zoon as Yousuf Shah Chak's queen consort, although there is scholarly debate about whether she was in fact a lower status mistress or member of his harem. She entered the palace in about 1570, and at some point changed her name to become Habba Khatoon. 

The couple were reportedly very content, and Yousuf Shah became the ruler of Kashmir. However, they were separated in 1579 after the Mughal emperor Akbar had Yousuf Shah arrested and imprisoned in Bihar, never to return. After this, Habba Khatoon became an ascetic, and spent the rest of her life wandering across the valley singing her songs.

Habba Khatun composed songs in Kashmiri. It is claimed that she introduced "loal" to Kashmiri poetry, "Loal" is more or less equivalent to the English 'lyric'. It conveys one brief thought. Braj Kachru states that Habba Khatun and Arnimal "perfected the loal form of Kashmiri poetry".

There is some dispute about the historical accuracy of Habba Khatun's biography, however the songs associated with her (including Mea ha keir tsei kith and Tse Kamiu Soni Meani) are widely popular across Kashmir. Her songs are frequently mournful and full of the sorrow of separation. Her tomb lies near Athwajan (English connotation: Handful of Rings) .

Legacy

An underpass  in Mughalpura, Lahore has been named after Habba Khatoon. Indian Coast Guard named a ship as CGS Habba Khatoon after her. 

Habba Khatoon (1978) is an Indian Kashmiri-language television film directed by Bashir Badgami for Doordarshan. It starred Rita Razdan in the titular role of the queen. Doordarshan also aired Habba Khatoon, another television show in Hindi on DD National about the poetess.

Mrinal Kulkarni portrayed her role in the Indian television series Noorjahan, which aired on DD National from 2000-2001.

Zooni is an unreleased Indian Hindi-language film by Muzaffar Ali that was supposed to release in 1990 but was eventually shelved. Earlier unsuccessful attempts in Indian cinema to portray her life on screen included one by Mehboob Khan in the 1960s and in the 80s by B. R. Chopra.

See also
Lal Ded
Arnimal

References

Sources
 Habba Khatoon (1554–1609), Biography
 Kashmiri poets: Habba Khatoon

Further reading
 

1554 births
1609 deaths
16th-century Indian poets
17th-century Indian poets
16th-century Indian women writers
17th-century Indian women writers
Indian women poets
Kashmiri people
Kashmiri poets
 
Peer babaPeer Baba on Razdan top